is a Japanese anime television series produced by Liden Films Kyoto Studio. The series aired from October to December 2021. A second season aired from April to June 2022.

Synopsis
It is a crossover series featuring chibi renditions of characters from franchises by Key including Kanon, Air, Clannad, Little Busters!, Rewrite, and others.

Characters

Production and release
On November 26, 2019, Key teased on Twitter that it had eight projects in the works for its 21st anniversary. On April 19, 2021, Key held an online event announcing that Kaginado, a crossover anime based on characters from various Key franchises, was in production for an October 2021 release. On September 24, 2021, the official website for Kaginado revealed the staff and cast for the anime. The announcement also revealed that Kazuya Sakamoto would be directing the series at Liden Films Kyoto Studio, with Takashi Aoshima being the chief writer alongside Kai and Tohya Okano as writers. Additionally, the voice actors from prior Key anime reprise their roles, with Asami Sanada voicing Misuzu Kamio due to the death of the original voice actor Tomoko Kawakami in 2011. In Japan, the series aired from October 13 to December 29, 2021 on Tokyo MX, KBS Kyoto, Sun TV, ux, HAB, abn, HTB, BS4, and AT-X. A second season aired from April 13 to June 29, 2022. The series is streaming internationally on Crunchyroll, Funimation, Hidive, Wakanim, Aniplus, bilibili, and Muse Asia.

Episode list

See also

 Isekai Quartet, a similar crossover anime featuring characters from series published by Kadokawa

Notes

References

External links
 

2021 anime television series debuts
Anime television series based on video games
Crossover anime and manga
Key (company)
Liden Films
Funimation
Tokyo MX original programming